Kovshovo is a rural locality (a village) in Ugolskoye Rural Settlement, Sheksninsky District, Vologda Oblast, Russia. The population was nine as of 2002.

Geography 
Kovshovo is located 19 km south of Sheksna (the district's administrative centre) by road. Gramotino is the nearest rural locality.

References 

Rural localities in Sheksninsky District